Thark is a 1932 British film farce, directed by Tom Walls, with a script by Ben Travers. In addition to Walls, the film stars Ralph Lynn and Robertson Hare. The film is a screen adaptation of the original 1927 Aldwych farce play Thark. It was made at British and Dominion's Elstree Studios.

Premise
Mrs. Todd is aggrieved at finding that the country house she has bought is evidently haunted. Sir Hector Benbow and his nephew, on behalf of the previous owner, set out to demonstrate that there is no ghost.

Cast
Hook – Robertson Hare*
Warner – Marjorie Corbett
Cherry Buck – Joan Brierley
Lionel Todd – Claude Hulbert
Mrs. Todd – Mary Brough*
Sir Hector Benbow – Tom Walls*
Ronald Gamble – Ralph Lynn*
Lady Benbow – Beryl de Querton
Kitty Stratton – Evelyn Bostock
Death – Gordon James*
Whittle – Hastings Lynn*

Cast members marked * were the creators of the roles in the original stage production; the Todds were surnamed "Frush" in the stage play.

Reception
The film was popular at the box office.

References

External links
Thark at IMDB

1932 films
1932 comedy films
Aldwych farce
British comedy films
British films based on plays
Films directed by Tom Walls
Films set in England
British black-and-white films
British and Dominions Studios films
Films shot at Imperial Studios, Elstree
1930s English-language films
1930s British films
English-language comedy films